Dewaminato Rikichi (March 20, 1907, as Rikichi Satō in Tsuchizaki-Minato, Akita Prefecture, Japan – May 17, 1964), was a professional sumo wrestler with Dewanoumi stable. He made his debut in 1928, reaching the top makuuchi division in 1935. His highest rank was sekiwake. In January 1939 he won the top division yūshō or championship with an undefeated 13–0 record, ending a run of five straight championships won by Futabayama. After his retirement in 1944 he worked as a coach at his stable until 1963, when he left the sumo world. He died a year later in 1964.

Career 

He first entered the ring in the Summer 1928 tournament.  In 1932, he was one of the few unsalaried wrestlers to be expelled from sumo by the Japan Sumo Association for being involved in a strike called the "Shunjūen Incident" that was largely unsuccessful.  He, along with many others, was allowed back in from the Spring 1933 tournament. He was allowed into the makushita division, but unranked. His hiatus seemed to have recharged his sumo, as he posted eight winning tournaments over four years from this point.  In this period, he also took the makushita championship in the Summer 1933 tournament, and after entering jūryō, in the following tournament, took the jūryō championship with a perfect 11–0 record in the Summer 1934 tournament.  

He was promoted to the top makuuchi division for the Spring 1935 tournament.  He managed to enter the titled ranks at sekiwake for the Spring 1937 tournament but only managed a 2–9 record and was demoted back to the untitled ranks of maegashira. In the Spring 1938 tournament, though he only had a 2–5 record before pulling out due to injury, he still managed a gold star or kinboshi win over yokozuna Minanogawa, incidentally one of the leaders of the strike back in 1933. He had another losing tournament that he had to withdraw from due to injury in Summer 1938. When he returned for the next tournament in the summer 1939 tournament at maegashira 17, he was on the cusp of relegation to the second division.  He responded by posting a 13–0 record, including a victory over future yokozuna Haguroyama and winning the championship.  Because he was a lower maegashira, he was not matched against yokozuna Futabayama, who in this same tournament had his record-setting winning streak broken at 69 by Dewaminato's stablemate Akinoumi.  The impact of Dewaminato's perfect championship, called a zenshō-yūshō was overshadowed by the fact that Futabayama had achieved zenshō-yūshō in the five previous tournaments up to this point, and would bounce back to achieve yet another one in the following Summer tournament.  

Dewaminato fought on after this, managing to stay in the upper maegashira ranks, and even managed to return to sekiwake for two consecutive tournaments in 1942–43.  His fortunes began to decline after this however, and after losing all ten of his bouts in the Summer 1944 tournament, he retired before the start of the Autumn 1944 tournament.

Retirement from sumo
He served as a sumo elder under the name Hamakaze Oyakata and worked as a coach at Dewanoumi stable. He left the Sumo Association in July 1963. He died in May 1964 at the age of 57.

Fighting style
Dewaminato's most common winning techniques were hatakikomi (slap down), sotogake (outer leg trip) and sukuinage (scoop throw).

Career record

See also
Glossary of sumo terms
List of past sumo wrestlers
List of sekiwake
List of sumo tournament top division champions
List of sumo tournament second division champions

References 

Japanese sumo wrestlers
Sumo people from Akita Prefecture
1907 births
1964 deaths